Maalamaal is a 1988 Indian Hindi-language comedy film starring Naseeruddin Shah and Satish Shah, directed by Kawal Sharma.

Although it was not officially acknowledged, the film is based on the 1985 English movie Brewster's Millions which itself was based on the 1902 novel Brewster's Millions by George Barr McCutcheon. At least six films have been made based on the novel, besides a 1906 Broadway play. The film is also known for Sunil Gavaskar, the renowned cricketer, making a guest appearance in the film.

Plot
Raj, a small-time cricketer, discovers that his grandfather has left a property of 3.3 billion rupees for him. But the inheritance comes with a clause that it would be his only if he is able to spend 300 Millions in 30 days. Raj, who has never seen so much money has no idea how to do that. But he goes about it with Govinda Sakharam Godbole, his friend by his side.

Another important character in the film is Chander Oberoi (Aditya Pancholi), who is planning to ruin Raj and takeover his business.

Cast
 Naseeruddin Shah as Rajkumar Saxena 
 Poonam Dhillon as Poonam Malhotra 
 Mandakini as Honey
 Satish Shah as Govinda Sakharam Godbole 
 Aditya Pancholi as Chander Oberoi 
 Dalip Tahil as Ghanshyam 
 Amjad Khan as Sulaiman Dada 
 Harindranath Chattopadhyay as Mangatram
 Bharat Bhushan as Mangatram's Manager
 Praveen Kumar Sobti as Jallad singh Security Guard
 Sunil Gavaskar as himself in a guest appearance
 Lalita Pawar as Gangubai
 Jankidas as Jankidas, Antique Shop Owner
 Yunus Parvez as Restaurant Owner 
 Jack Gaud as Goon of Sulemaan Dada

Music
"Kal Na Aaya Hai Na Aayega" - Alisha Chinai
"Maal Hai To Taal Hai" v1 - Kishore Kumar, Amit Kumar, Anu Malik, Sudesh Bhosle
"Maal Hai To Taal Hai" v2 - Kishore Kumar, Amit Kumar, Anu Malik, Sudesh Bhosle
"Meri Raato Me" - Alisha Chinai, Anu Malik
"Pehla Pehla Pyar" - Anu Malik, Alisha Chinai

References

External links
 
 Bollywood's Dialogues

1988 films
Films scored by Anu Malik
1980s Hindi-language films
Films about inheritances
Films based on Brewster's Millions
Films based on American novels
Indian comedy-drama films